The Lukina is a river of northeastern Kazakhstan. It discharges into the Aksu (Russian: Belaya), a tributary of the Bukhtarma.

Rivers of Kazakhstan